Mary Dorothy Kirby (January 15, 1920 – December 12, 2000) was an American professional golfer and sportscaster.

Born in West Point, Georgia, her family moved to Atlanta when she was ten. At the age of 13, Kirby's victory at the 1933 Georgia Women's Amateur Championship made her the youngest female golfer to ever win a state championship. It marked the first of her six Georgia championships, her last coming 20 years later in 1953. As well, she defeated amateurs and professionals in winning back-to-back Titleholders Championship in 1941-42. In 1943 she won the North and South Women's Amateur at Pinehurst.

She attended Washington Seminary in Atlanta, Georgia, from 1934-1938. Her senior caption reads: "Dot Kirby was voted 'Most Athletic Senior.' She has played class basketball and volleyball since 1935, and in '36-'37 she was captain of both teams. A member of the "A" [Athletic] Club since her sophomore year, she was elected vice-president in her senior year. In 1935 she held the responsible office of class treasurer. She was a member of the Varsity in 1935, a cheerleader in 1938. Dot is sports editor of Facts and Fancies [school yearbook]."

Dorothy Kirby played in her first U.S. Women's Amateur in 1934 at age fourteen. She was the runner-up to Betty Jameson in 1939 and to Louise Suggs in 1947 then won the most prestigious women's event in 1951. Attempting to defend her title, in 1952 she had the lowest round of the tournament but was still knocked out early. Dorothy Kirby was a member of four U.S. Curtis Cup teams (1948, 1950, 1952, 1954), and despite her success as an amateur, she chose not to join the professional LPGA Tour.

Dorothy Kirby retired from competition in the mid-1950s and worked as a radio and television sportscaster and sales representative for thirty-five years. In 1974 she was inducted into the Georgia Sports Hall of Fame and the Georgia Golf Hall of Fame in 1989.

She died in Atlanta in 2000.

Amateur wins
1933 Georgia Women's Amateur
1935 Georgia Women's Amateur
1936 Georgia Women's Amateur
1937 Southern Women's Amateur
1941 Georgia Women's Amateur
1943 North and South Women's Amateur
1951 U.S. Women's Amateur
1952 Georgia Women's Amateur
1953 Georgia Women's Amateur

Major championships

Wins (2)

Team appearances
Amateur
Curtis Cup (representing the United States): 1948 (winners), 1950 (winners), 1952, 1954 (winners)

References

American female golfers
Amateur golfers
Winners of ladies' major amateur golf championships
Winners of LPGA major golf championships
Golfers from Atlanta
People from West Point, Georgia
1920 births
2000 deaths
20th-century American women
20th-century American people